Black Jesus Voice is a solo album by Richard H. Kirk, released by Rough Trade Records in 1986. The album was also released on cassette doubled up with Kirk's Ugly Spirit album. In 1995, The Grey Area (Mute) re-released the CD.

Track listing
"Streetgang (It Really Hurts)"
"Hipnotic"
"Boom Shala"
"Black Jesus Voice"
"Martyrs of Palestine"
"This Is the H-Bomb Sound"
"Short Wave"

Personnel
Produced and recorded by Richard H. Kirk

References

1986 albums
Rough Trade Records albums
Richard H. Kirk albums